The Monterrey WCT was a men's tennis tournament played in Monterrey, Mexico from 1976 to 1977 and 1981 to 1983.  The event was part of the WCT Tour and was played on indoor carpet courts.

Finals

Singles

Doubles

See also
 Mexico City WCT

References

World Championship Tennis
Tennis tournaments in Mexico
Defunct tennis tournaments in Mexico
Defunct sports competitions in Mexico
1976 establishments in Mexico
1983 disestablishments in Mexico
Recurring sporting events established in 1976
Recurring sporting events disestablished in 1983
Sport in Monterrey
Carpet court tennis tournaments
Monterrey WCT